Shelbourne Football Club is an Irish association football club based in Northside, Dublin. It is the women's section of the League of Ireland club Shelbourne FC. The senior women's team currently plays in the Women's National League. They have also fielded teams in the Dublin Women's Soccer League, the Metropolitan Girls League and the North Dublin Schoolboys/Girls League.

History

1990s
In 1995 Shelbourne F.C. took over the women's football club Welsox F.C.. Welsox played in both the Civil Service League and the Dublin Women's Soccer League and had won the FAI Women's Cup in both 1992 and 1994. They were also DWSL runners-up in 1995. After coming under the Shelbourne umbrella, they also finished as FAI Women's Cup runners-up in 1997 and 1999 and were DWSL runners-up in 1998, 1999 and 2000. Future Republic of Ireland women's national football team manager Susan Ronan played for both Welsox and Shelbourne during this era. Following its integration into Shelbourne, the club was administered mainly, though not exclusively, by women on a voluntary basis while it received financial and logistical support from the men's club. However, in 2002, following a change in management and coaching staff, the original Shelbourne Ladies team disbanded and a core group of players moved to Templeogue United to merge with an existing girls' team.

Revival
After a five-year period of inactivity, Shelbourne Women's F.C. was revived in 2007 by Mick Neville, then serving as a director of coaching at Shelbourne F.C., and coach Keith O'Neill. The club initially fielded schoolgirl teams in the North Dublin Schoolboys/girls League before also joining the Metropolitan Girls League and the Dublin Women's Soccer League.

Women's National League
In 2015 Shelbourne Ladies merged with Raheny United's senior women's team. This effectively saw Shelbourne Ladies takeover Raheny United's place in the Women's National League. During the subsequent 2015–16 season, Shelbourne Ladies finished as runners-up in FAI Women's Cup, the WNL Shield and the Women's National League. All three competitions were won by Wexford Youths. However Shelbourne Ladies did win the WNL Cup after defeating UCD Waves 3–2 in the final at Richmond Park on 1 May 2016. In 2016 Shelbourne won the FAI Women's Cup after defeating Wexford Youths 5–0 in the final. The most notable individual performance to come out of the game was undoubtedly that of Shels' Leanne Kiernan, who scored a hat-trick and picked up the 'player of the match' award for her efforts.

The team won their first league championship when they finished the shortened 2016 season in first place. They qualified for the 2017–18 UEFA Women's Champions League with that title. In March 2019 Shelbourne announced a number of steps intended to boost "equality and parity of esteem for all of our players". They dropped the word Ladies from the women's team's name and moved WNL home games from the AUL Complex to the main stadium at Tolka Park.

Shelbourne Women U18
Shelbourne Women U18 won the 2015 WFAI Intermediate Cup, defeating St Catherine's 6–0 in the final. Shelbourne Women U18 also reached the semi-finals of the 2015 FAI Women's Cup, defeating two members of the Women's National League along the way. In the last sixteen they defeated Cork City 3–2 and in the quarter finals they won 4–0 against Castlebar Celtic. In the semi-final they lost 4–0 to the Shelbourne Women senior team.

Grounds 
Shelbourne Women's National League team play their home games at Tolka Park.
They played their home games in 2018 at AUL Complex.
They formerly played at Morton Stadium from 2015 to 2017. The club's junior teams play at the AUL Complex.

Players

Current squad

Former players

Honours

Shelbourne
Women's National League
Winners: 2016, 2021, 2022 3
Runners-up: 2015–16, 2018
FAI Women's Cup
Winners: 2016, 2022: 2
Runners-up: 1997, 1999, 2015, 2021: 4
WNL Cup
Winners: 2016, 2017
Dublin Women's Soccer League
Winners: 2015: 1
Runners-up: 1998, 1999, 2000: 3
WNL Shield
Runners-up: 2015

Welsox
Dublin Women's Soccer League
Runners-up: 1995: 1
FAI Women's Cup
Winners: 1992, 1994: 2

References

Ladies
Association football clubs established in 1995
Women's association football clubs in the Republic of Ireland
Association football clubs in Dublin (city)
1995 establishments in Ireland
Women's National League (Ireland) teams
Dublin Women's Soccer League teams